Toghli Sadat (also Romanized as Ţoghlī Sādāt; also known as Toqlī Sādāt) is a village in Howmeh-ye Gharbi Rural District, in the Central District of Ramhormoz County, Khuzestan Province, Iran. At the 2006 census, its population was 245, in 41 families.

References 

Populated places in Ramhormoz County